Vladimir Prelog  (23 July 1906 – 7 January 1998) was a Croatian-Swiss organic chemist who received the 1975 Nobel Prize in chemistry for his research into the stereochemistry of organic molecules and reactions. Prelog was born and grew up in Sarajevo. He lived and worked in Prague, Zagreb and Zürich during his lifetime.

Early life
Prelog was born in Sarajevo, Condominium of Bosnia and Herzegovina, at that time within Austria-Hungary, to Croat parents who were working there. His father, Milan, a native of Zagreb, was a history professor at a gymnasium in Sarajevo and later at the University of Zagreb. As an 8-year-old boy, he stood near the place where the assassination of Franz Ferdinand occurred.

Education

Prelog attended elementary school in Sarajevo, but in 1915, as a child, Prelog moved to Zagreb (then part of the Austro-Hungary) with his parents. In Zagreb he graduated from elementary school. At first, he attended gymnasium in Zagreb, but soon afterwards, his father got a job in Osijek, so he continued his education there. He spent two years in Osijek gymnasium, where he became interested in chemistry under the influence of his professor Ivan Kuria.

In 1922, as a 16-year-old boy, his first scientific work was published in the German scientific journal Chemiker Zeitung. The article concerned an analytical instrument used in chemical labs. Prelog completed his high school education in Zagreb in 1924. Following his father's wishes, he moved to Prague, where he received his diploma in chemical engineering from the Czech Technical University in 1928. He received his Sc.D in 1929. His teacher was Emil Votoček, while his assistant and mentor Rudolf Lukeš introduced him to the world of organic chemistry.

Upon leaving the Czech Technical University, Prelog worked in the plant laboratory of the private firm of G.J. Dríza in Prague; few academic positions were available due to the Great Depression. Prelog was in charge of the production of rare chemicals that were not commercially available at that time. He worked for Driza from 1929 until 1935. During the time, he got his first doctoral candidate, a company owner at Driza. He performed research in his spare time, investigating alkaloids in cacao bark.

Career and research

Prelog wanted to work in an academic environment, so he accepted the position of lecturer at the University of Zagreb in 1935. At the Technical Faculty in Zagreb, he lectured on organic chemistry and chemical engineering.

With the help of collaborators and students, Prelog started researching quinine and its related compounds. He was financially supported by the pharmaceutical factory "Kaštel", currently Pliva. He developed a financially successful method of producing Streptazol, one of the first commercial sulfonamides. In 1941, while at Zagreb, Prelog developed the first synthesis of adamantane, a hydrocarbon with an unusual structure that was isolated from Moravian oil fields.

Zürich
In 1941, in the midst of World War II, Prelog was invited to lecture in Germany by Richard Kuhn. Shortly afterwards, Lavoslav Ružička, whom Prelog asked for help, invited Prelog to visit him on his way to Germany. He and his wife used those invitations to escape to Zürich in Switzerland. With Ružička's help, he gained support from CIBA Ltd. and started to work in the Organic Chemistry Laboratory in the Swiss Federal Institute of Technology (ETH, or Eidgenössische Technische Hochschule). Prelog was able to separate the chiral enantiomers of Tröger's base in 1944 by chromatography on an optically active substrate.

With this chiral resolution, he was able to prove that not only carbon but also nitrogen atoms can be the chiral centre in a molecule, which had been speculated for several years. His relationship with Ružička helped him climb up the academic hierarchical ladder. Starting as an assistant, he became Privat-Dozent, Titularprofessor, associate professor, and in 1952 full professor. In 1957 he succeeded Ružička as head of the Laboratory. Since Prelog disliked administrative duties, he implemented rotating chairmanship in the ETH. Prelog joined the ETH at the right time, since Ružička's Jewish co-workers left the country and went to the United States, so Prelog filled the vacuum they left.

Later work in Switzerland
Prelog's main interest was focused on alkaloids. He found an ideal topic in the elucidation of the structure of solanine; he continued his work on Cinchona alkaloids and started to investigate strychnine. He showed that Robert Robinson's formula for strychnine was not correct. Although the formula he proposed was also not the right one, the discovery increased his international prestige. Later he worked on elucidating the structures of aromatic Erythrina alkaloids with Derek Barton, Oskar Jeger and Robert Burns Woodward.

At mid-century, the instrumental revolution necessitated a new approach to structural elucidation. Purely chemical methods had become outdated and had lost some of their intellectual appeal. Recognizing the growing importance of microbial metabolites, Prelog started working on these compounds, which possess unusual structures and interesting biological properties. It led him into antibiotics, and he subsequently elucidated the structures of such compounds as nonactin, boromycin, and rifamycins. For Prelog, natural products represented more than a chemical challenge. He considered them a record of billions of years of evolution.

In 1944 at the ETH, Prelog managed to separate enantiomers with "asymmetric" trivalent nitrogen by column chromatography at a time when this method was still in its infancy. His work on medium-sized alicyclic and heterocyclic rings established him as a pioneer in stereochemistry and conformational theory and brought an invitation to give the first Centenary Lecture of the Chemical Society in London in 1949. He synthesised medium-sized ring compounds with 8 to 12 members from dicarboxylic acid esters by acyloin condensation and explained their unusual chemical reactivity by a "nonclassical" strain because of energetically unfavorable conformations. He also contributed to the understanding of Bredt's rule by showing that a double bond may occur at the bridgehead if the ring is large enough.

In his research of asymmetric syntheses, Prelog studied enantioselective reactions and established rules for the relationship between configuration of educts and products. From Prelog's researches into the stereospecificity of microbiological reductions of alicyclic ketones and the enzymic oxidation of alcohols, he contributed not only to the knowledge of the mechanism of stereospecificity of enzymic reactions in general but also to the structure of the active site of the enzyme.

Specifying the growing number of stereoisomers of organic compounds became for Prelog one of his important aims. In 1954 he joined R. S. Cahn and Christopher Ingold in their efforts to build a system for specifying a particular stereoisomers by simple and unambiguous descriptors that could be easily assigned and deciphered: The CIP system (Cahn-Ingold-Prelog) was developed for defining absolute configuration using "sequence rules". Together they published two papers. After Cahn and Ingold died, Prelog published a third paper on the topic. In 1959, Prelog obtained Swiss citizenship.

Awards and honours
Prelog was elected to the American Academy of Arts and Sciences in 1960 and the United States National Academy of Sciences in 1961.

Prelog was elected a Foreign Member of the Royal Society (ForMemRS) in 1962 for his contribution to the development of modern stereochemistry.

Prelog received the 1975 Nobel Prize in Chemistry for his research into the stereochemistry of organic molecules and reaction, sharing it with the Australian/British research chemist John Cornforth. He was elected to the American Philosophical Society the following year.

In 1986, he became an honorary member of the Yugoslav Academy of Sciences and Arts. Prelog was also a member of Serbian Academy of Sciences and Arts.

Personal life
In 1933, Prelog married Kamila Vitek. The couple had a son Jan (born 1949).

An intellectual with a wide cultural background, Prelog was one of the 109 Nobel Prize winners who signed the peace appeal for Croatia in 1991. 

Vladimir Prelog died in Zürich, at the age of 91. An urn containing Prelog's ashes was ceremoniously interred at the Mirogoj cemetery in Zagreb on 27 September 2001. In 2008, a memorial to Prelog was unveiled in Prague.

References

External links 
  including the Nobel Lecture, 12 December 1975 Chirality in Chemistry

1906 births
1998 deaths
20th-century Croatian people
20th-century chemists
Croatian chemists
Organic chemists
Nobel laureates in Chemistry
Croatian Nobel laureates
Austro-Hungarian Nobel laureates
Swiss Nobel laureates
Academic staff of ETH Zurich
Foreign Members of the Royal Society
Foreign associates of the National Academy of Sciences
Foreign Members of the USSR Academy of Sciences
Foreign Members of the Russian Academy of Sciences
Croats of Bosnia and Herzegovina
Croatian Austro-Hungarians
Croatian emigrants to Switzerland
Yugoslav emigrants to Switzerland
Scientists from Sarajevo
Burials at Mirogoj Cemetery
Czech Technical University in Prague alumni
Stereochemists
Members of the Serbian Academy of Sciences and Arts
Yugoslav Nobel laureates
Members of the American Philosophical Society